Heathrow Terminal 3 is an airport terminal at Heathrow Airport, serving London, the capital city of the United Kingdom. Terminal 3 is currently used as one of the main global hubs of the International Airlines Group members British Airways (alongside Terminal 5) and Iberia since 12 July 2022. It is also used by the majority of members of the Oneworld and a few SkyTeam alliances along with several long-haul non-affiliated airlines. It is also the base for Virgin Atlantic.

History

Terminal 3 was opened as the Oceanic Terminal on 13 November 1961; it was built to handle flight departures for long-haul routes. Renamed Terminal 3 in 1968, it was expanded in 1970 with the addition of an arrivals building. Other facilities added included the UK's first moving walkways. BOAC and the two US airlines, Pan American World Airways and Trans World Airlines (TWA), dominated operations at the terminal throughout the 1960s and 1970s. In 1969 the terminal was renovated to handle the new Boeing 747 which was introduced to the airport on 23 January 1970. In 1990 Pan American sold its Heathrow landing rights to United Airlines around the same time TWA sold them to American Airlines.

The terminal was refurbished between 1987 and 1990 at a cost of £110 million. In 2006, the new £105 million Pier 6 was completed to accommodate the Airbus A380 superjumbo; Emirates and Qantas now operate regular flights from Terminal 3 using the Airbus A380. Redevelopment of Terminal 3's forecourt through the addition of a new four-lane drop-off area and a large pedestrianised plaza, complete with canopy to the front of the terminal building, was completed in 2007. These improvements were intended to improve passengers' experiences, reduce traffic congestion and improve security. As part of this project, Virgin Atlantic was assigned its own dedicated check-in area, known as 'Zone A', which features a large sculpture and atrium.

Heathrow Airport Limited also has plans for a £1bn upgrade of the rest of the terminal over the next ten years which will include the renovation of aircraft piers and the arrivals forecourt. A new baggage system connecting to Terminal 5 (for British Airways connections) is currently under construction. In addition to the baggage system, the baggage claim hall is also set to undergo changes with dedicated A380 belts and an improved design and layout.

In 2020 due to the COVID-19 pandemic, all flights from Terminal 3 and 4 were suspended and flights temporarily moved to Terminals 2 and 5. The railway and tube station remained open to serve Terminal 2. The terminal was reopened for use by Virgin Atlantic and Delta on 15 July 2021.

Usage

The main presence in Terminal 3 is Virgin Atlantic. Air France, American Airlines, British Airways, Cathay Pacific, Delta Air Lines, Emirates, Iberia, KLM and Qantas are the other major users of the terminal. This terminal is mainly reserved for long haul flights. Air France, British Airways, Finnair, Iberia and KLM are the only short haul airlines flying from this terminal.

Oneworld
Terminal 3 is used by the majority of the members of the Oneworld airline alliance: American Airlines,  Cathay Pacific, Finnair, Iberia, Japan Airlines, Qantas, Royal Jordanian, and SriLankan Airlines. British Airways, which mainly uses Terminal 5, also offers some flights from this terminal. As of 12 July 2022, it is one of the global hubs of the International Airlines Group after Iberia moved in from Terminal 5. However it is not used by Malaysia Airlines, Royal Air Maroc and Qatar Airways (all Terminal 4 only).

SkyTeam
6 SkyTeam member airlines also use Terminal 3: Aeroméxico, Air France, Delta Air Lines, KLM, Middle East Airlines and Virgin Atlantic. Delta moved all flights to Terminal 3 on 14 September 2016 to ease connections with partner Virgin Atlantic. Following the closure of Terminal 4 and have temporary operating at Terminal 2, Air France and KLM moved all flights to Terminal 3 on 24 August 2021 to ease connections with Delta and Virgin Atlantic.WestJet, who has relationships with SkyTeam members Air France, Delta, and KLM along with Virgin Atlantic also use this terminal since March 2022 but the airline itself is not a SkyTeam member. Air France and KLM will return to Terminal 4 on 26 March 2023.  

Two other SkyTeam members Kenya Airways and Korean Air also have previously operated from this terminal since the reopening of Terminal 3 until they moved back to Terminal 4 when it reopened in June 2022.

Non-aligned
The principal non-aligned airline is Emirates. The other non-aligned airlines include Beijing Capital Airlines, Iran Air and LATAM Brasil. As of 2021, Biman Bangladesh Airlines has transferred its flights from Terminal 4 to this terminal. During the pandemic, new airlines Rwandair, Vistara and WestJet began flights from this terminal. 

Oman Air previously used this terminal until it moved to Terminal 4. Turkmenistan Airlines previously used this terminal until it moved to Terminal 4 in 2016. Etihad Airways and Royal Brunei Airlines previously operated from this terminal between September 2021 and 14 June 2022 when they shifted back to Terminal 4. Bamboo Airways previously used this terminal until it moved to Gatwick in October 2022.

Star Alliance
Today, no Star Alliance airlines use Terminal 3. Most Star Alliance airlines now use Terminal 2.

In the past, a number of Star Alliance airlines used this terminal: Air Canada, Air China, All Nippon Airways, EgyptAir, Ethiopian Airlines, EVA Air, Scandinavian Airlines, Singapore Airlines, Thai Airways, and Turkish Airlines.

Ground transport

Inter-terminal transport
Terminal 3 is connected by an underground walkway to Terminal 2. Terminals 4 and 5 can be reached by the free Elizabeth line or Heathrow Express rail service. London Underground services can also be used to transfer to Terminals 4 and 5 (the former requiring a change of train at Hatton Cross) for free.

In addition, numerous buses ply between the Central Bus Station (for Terminals 2 and 3) and the other terminals. However, using the train service is much quicker and easier for passengers with luggage.

Road links
As part of the two central terminals at Heathrow, it is linked to the M4 motorway via the M4 spur road and through a tunnel under the north runway.

Rail links

Bus links
Terminal 3 is accessible to both bus and coach services from Heathrow Central bus station.

There are also several coach services operated by National Express operating to other London airports such as Gatwick, Stansted and Luton; and other cities in the United Kingdom.

References

External links

Heathrow Airport Terminal 3 (official web page)

3 London Heathrow Terminal 3
Heathrow Airport Holdings
Airport terminals
Terminal 3
Transport infrastructure completed in 1961
1961 establishments in England